Dieter Bertholdt (born 20 July 1935) is a German chess player.

Biography
Dieter Bertholdt is a graduate mathematician and has worked in the aircraft industry. The first his chess club in 1949 was the SG Mickten in Dresden. From there Dieter Bertholdt moved to Sportclub Einheit Dresden. With the Sportclub Einheit Dresden he won East Germany Team Chess Championships in 1957, 1958 and 1962. Dieter Bertholdt had great success in East Germany Chess Championships. At the 6th East Germany Chess Championship, which was held in 1956 in Leipzig, he scored 9.5 points from 15 games and finished third. In the following East Germany Chess championship in Sömmerda in 1957 Dieter Bertholdt finished second.

Dieter Bertholdt played for East Germany in the Chess Olympiad:
 In 1958, at fourth board in the 13th Chess Olympiad in Munich (+2, =7, -3).

Dieter Bertholdt played for East Germany in the World Student Team Chess Championships:
 In 1956, at fourth board in the 3rd World Student Team Chess Championship in Uppsala (+5, =0, -3),
 In 1957, at second board in the 4th World Student Team Chess Championship in Reykjavik (+4, =7, -2),
 In 1958, at third board in the 5th World Student Team Chess Championship in Varna (+1, =4, -2),
 In 1959, at fourth board in the 6th World Student Team Chess Championship in Budapest (+5, =4, -1),
 In 1960, at third board in the 7th World Student Team Chess Championship in Leningrad (+6, =1, -4).

In 1962 Dieter Bertholdt retired from chess sports. Only in 1987 he played again.

References

External links

Dieter Bertholdt chess games at 365chess.com

1935 births
Sportspeople from Dresden
German chess players
East German chess players
Chess Olympiad competitors
Living people